Ejlstrup is a village, with a population of 1,304 (1 January 2022), situated west of Odense, in Funen, Denmark.  It lies to the south of Korup and north of Ubberud.

References

Suburbs of Odense
Populated places in Funen
Odense Municipality